Greigia atrocastanea is a plant species in the genus Greigia. This species is endemic to Bolivia.

References

atrocastanea
Flora of Bolivia